The 1963 San Francisco State Gators football team represented San Francisco State College—now known as San Francisco State University—as a member of the Far Western Conference (FWC) during the 1963 NCAA College Division football season. Led by third-year head coach Vic Rowen, San Francisco State compiled an overall record of 6–2–1 with a mark of 3–1–1 in conference play, sharing the FWC title with Humboldt State and UC Davis. The Gators won or shared the title for the conference for third consecutive season. The team outscored its opponents 157 to 128 on the season. The Gators played home games at Cox Stadium in San Francisco.

Schedule

Notes

References

San Francisco State
San Francisco State Gators football seasons
Northern California Athletic Conference football champion seasons
San Francisco State Gators football